The 22nd Annual South African Music Awards was held on 4 June 2016 at Inkosi Albert Luthuli International Convention Centre, Durban, South Africa and was hosted by Somizi Mhlongo and Thando Thabethe. The nominees were announced on 21 April 2016 with Nathi, Emtee, Zonke Dikana, and Riky Rick topping the list with four nominations each. Nathi garnered the most awards with five while Black Coffee came closest by claiming four awards.

Performers

 Moneoa 
 Loki Rothman
 Jabu Hlongwane
 Wouter Kellerman
 AKA
 Da L.E.S
 Nasty C
 Emtee
 Fifi Cooper
 Nathi
 DJ Ganyani
 DJ Merlon
 Revolution
 Prince Kaybee
 Dreamteam
 Big Nuz
 Thee Legacy song they performed
 Raheem Kemet
 Lakota Silva
 Nakhane Toure
 24 Skies
 Thokozani Langa
 Khuzani
 Saarkies
 The Fraternity
 Andriette
 Pierre Rossouw
 iFANi
 DJ Fortee
 DJ Sliqe
 Mobi Dixon

Winners and nominees
Below is the list of nominees and winners for the popular music categories. Winners are highlighted in bold.

Special Awards
 Amstel Record of the Year (Public Vote)
 "Roll Up" – Emtee

 International Achievement Award
 Black Coffee

 Lifetime Achievement Awards
 Nana Coyote (posthumous award)
 Roger Lucey
 Bhekumuzi Luthuli (posthumous award)

Sales and Downloads Awards
 Best Selling Album
 Buyelekhaya – Nathi

 Best Selling DVD
 Volume 19: Back to the Cross – Joyous Celebration

 Best Overall Music Download
 "Bayede Baba" – Sfiso Ncwane

 Best Selling Ring-Back Tone
 "Bayede Baba" – Sfiso Ncwane

 Best Selling Full-Track Download
 "Nomvula" – Nathi

Sponsored Awards
 Highest Radio Airplay of the Year (SAMPRA)
 "Shumaya" – DBN Nyts

Highest Radio Airplay Composers’ Award (SAMRO)
 "Shumaya" by Dbn Nyts – Samkele Maphumulo, Kabelo Masekane, Cebo Ngcobo, Wanda Shabalala and Lwazi Yokwana

Best Selling Digital Download Composers’ Award (CAPASSO)
 "Bayede Baba" – Sfiso Ncwane

References

External links
 

South African Music Awards
South African Music Awards
South African Music Awards
South African Music Awards